CBDQ-FM is a radio station broadcasting at 96.3 MHz from Labrador City, Newfoundland and Labrador, Canada, and is the local Radio One station of the Canadian Broadcasting Corporation. CBDQ has no rebroadcasters.

History
CBDQ began as a CBC Low Power Relay Transmitter (LPRT) on the AM band rebroadcasting CFGB Happy Valley-Goose Bay. By 1984 it was operating on 1490 kHz with 1,000 watts day/250 watts night. In 1994, CBDQ was granted a separate licence to originate programming. In 1996, the station switched to 96.3 MHz and the call sign was then changed to CBDQ-FM.

Local programming
CBDQ contributes reports to CFGB-FM Happy Valley-Goose Bay during the local morning show, Labrador Morning hosted by Janice Goudie.

For the remainder of local programming blocks within the CBC Radio One schedule, CBDQ broadcasts programming from CBN in St. John's.

References

External links
CBC Newfoundland and Labrador
 

Bdq
Labrador City
Bdq